Sujith Ariyapala was a Sri Lankan cricketer. He was a right-arm off-break bowler who played for Moors Sports Club.

Having appeared in a miscellaneous match for the side ten seasons previously, Ariyapala made a single first-class appearance for the side, during the 1990–91 season, against Colts Cricket Club. In the only innings in which he batted, he scored a duck.

He took two wickets from 21 overs with the ball, conceding 53 runs.

External links
Sujith Ariyapala at Cricket Archive

Sri Lankan cricketers
Moors Sports Club cricketers
Living people
Year of birth missing (living people)
Place of birth missing (living people)